Cumberland district may refer to any of the following circumscriptions in Canada :

 Cumberland (electoral district), a Federal electoral district
 Cumberland (Nova Scotia electoral district)
 Cumberland (Saskatchewan provincial electoral district)
 Cumberland (N.W.T. electoral district)

See also 
 Cumberland (disambiguation)
 Cumberland District (VHSL), in the Virginia High School League